Ragnar "Raggi" Þórhallsson (born 6 March 1987) is an Icelandic musician. He is the lead vocalist and guitarist, along with Nanna Bryndís Hilmarsdóttir, of the Icelandic indie folk band Of Monsters and Men.

Early life
Ragnar attended Fjölbrautaskólinn í Garðabæ, a school in Garðabær. Ragnar got his first guitar at the age of 9 but did not start playing until 17.

Of Monsters and Men
Ragnar joined the band in 2010. The band then entered the 2010 annual Icelandic music competition Músíktilraunir, which they won. They soon released their debut studio album My Head Is an Animal in late 2011. The album charted in multiple regions and the band gained popularity worldwide. After the Seattle radio station KEXP broadcast a performance from Ragnar's living room, the band went viral. 

After a successful first album, the band released their second studio album Beneath the Skin in 2015.

Ragnar also came up with the band name, Of Monsters and Men. He plays the guitar left-handed.

References

External links
 Of Monsters and Men's Official Site
 

Ragnar Thorhallsson
Ragnar Thorhallsson
1987 births
Living people
Ragnar Thorhallsson
Ragnar Thorhallsson
Ragnar Thorhallsson
Alternative rock singers
Ragnar Thorhallsson
Ragnar Thorhallsson
People from Garðabær
Of Monsters and Men members